is a German surname and a Low German (Plattdüütsch) masculine given name.

Origin and meaning 
The name Oelfke, name of farmers from the "Hohe Heidmark" of the administrative district Heidekreis in Lower-Saxony, Germany traces back to Ol, Oel=Adel (nobility), Od=Besitz (property), like Oleff, Oloff, Odulleib, that's the one who has the life in sense of "being inheritor", simply expressed that's the one who owns the inheritance of farmer. The farm's name "Oelfkenhof" in Oerbke is already traced to the "Celler Schatzregister" of 1438.

A descendant of the Oelfke family immigrated to the area of Hamburg, Minnesota where thousands of his descendants now live.

Variants

Oelfke
 Heinz Oelfke (born 1934), German author
 Monika Fornaçon, born Oelfke (born 1964), German football referee

Oelfken
 Tami Oelfken (1888–1957), German author and school reformer

Oelke
 Brigitte Oelke (born 1975), Swiss musician and actor
Jürgen Oelke (born 1940), German rowing coxswain

Oelkers
Bryan Oelkers (born 1961), American Major League Baseball pitcher
 Claire Oelkers (born 1985), singer of the German rock band Karpatenhund
Olga Oelkers (1887–1969), German fencer

References

Low German given names
Low German surnames
Heidmark